Zombo.com is a single-serving site created in 1999. It was originally a faculty and student joke from the George Washington University Center for Professional Development. The site parodies Flash introductory web pages that play while the rest of a site's content loads. Zombo took the concept to a humorous extreme, consisting of one long introductory page that leads to an invitation to sign up for a newsletter.

The site was initially a Flash animation, but as of 5 January 2021, the website now uses HTML5 instead due to Adobe Flash Player being discontinued.

Content 
Zombo.com consists of a "blank" page, a colorful title, and an animation of seven colorful pulsating discs, making them appear as though they are rotating. The website also contains an audio clip, in which a man welcomes the visitor to "Zombocom".

Flash version 
After some time, the option to sign up for a "newZletter" appears. This is a continuation of the joke as it is actually a short link to http://www.zombo.com/join1.htm, which tells the reader that this particular option is not available yet. This message is conveyed as a humorously written thank you in the same register form of "newZletter," stating "ThankZ for your patience."

The HTML markup of the website also contains the comment "Please Visit http://www.15footstick.com our other website ThankZ" which leads to an old parody website.

HTML5 version 
Unlike the Flash version, the audio clip will loop to the start when it ends, removing the "newZletter" message. The HTML markup comment was also removed. Additionally, the discs in the center actually spin rather than changing color.

Popularity 
Video game producer Bill Roper and artist Dave Rowntree have each listed Zombo as their favorite website; Rowntree explains, "I think [zombo.com] paraphrases the [inter]net. Promises you the earth but delivers a bit of animation with a scratchy soundtrack!" Web animator Joel Veitch chose Zombo.com as the least useful website, since "it doesn't do anything except tell you how wonderful it is." Ian McClelland, currently Managing Director of Guardian Australia, but at the time Senior Producer for Cartoon Network, also cited Zombo.com as the least useful site in the same column two years previously  "Utterly useless, absolutely brilliant". Mark Sullivan of PC World listed Zombo among the Internet's ten most useless websites, concluding, "Well, in fact, nothing happens at zombo.com." Samela Harris of The Advertiser calls Zombo.com "the most welcoming website on the Internet", and Daryl Lim of Digital Life  calls Zombo.com "the ultimate time-waster". A listing in The Australian writes, "Zombo.com has just one joke, but it's a good one."

On 4 September 2013, Matthew Inman, creator of the webcomic The Oatmeal, listed Zombo.com as his favorite website in an interview with Runner's World.

On 23 January 2020, Terry Cavanagh, programmer of VVVVVV and Super Hexagon, created a VR version of Zombo.com.

References

External links 
 ZOMBO official website
 Another HTML5 alternative
 Anything at ZomboCOM (Archived)

Single-serving sites
Internet properties established in 1999
American comedy websites
1999 establishments in the United States